David Campbell Humphreys (November 9, 1817 – July 12, 1879) was an Associate Justice of the Supreme Court of the District of Columbia.

Education and career

Born in Morgan County, Alabama, Humphreys began the practice of law in Madison County, Alabama. He was a member of the Alabama House of Representatives in 1843, 1849, 1853, and 1868. He was a planter and in private practice in Huntsville, Alabama from 1850 to 1861. During the American Civil War, he served in the Confederate States Army, rising to the rank of Colonel.

Federal judicial service

Humphreys was nominated by President Ulysses S. Grant on April 22, 1870, to an Associate Justice seat on the Supreme Court of the District of Columbia (now the United States District Court for the District of Columbia) vacated by Associate Justice George P. Fisher. He was confirmed by the United States Senate on May 10, 1870, and received his commission on May 13, 1870. His service terminated on July 2, 1879, due to his death in Fairfax County, Virginia.

Unsuccessful nomination

In 1873, President Grant nominated Humphreys to a joint seat on the United States District Court for the Middle District of Alabama, the United States District Court for the Northern District of Alabama and the United States District Court for the Southern District of Alabama, in an effort to replace the increasingly unpopular Judge Richard Busteed with an Alabama native (Busteed was simultaneously nominated to take Humphreys' seat in the District of Columbia), but the nomination was returned by the Senate as irregular.

Home

Humphreys' house in Huntsville, built in 1848, was listed on the National Register of Historic Places in 1977.

References

Sources
 

1817 births
1879 deaths
Judges of the United States District Court for the District of Columbia
United States federal judges appointed by Ulysses S. Grant
19th-century American judges
American planters
Confederate States Army officers
Lawyers from Huntsville, Alabama
Members of the Alabama House of Representatives
19th-century American politicians